The Kuafu project is a Chinese space project to establish a space weather forecasting system composed of three satellites, originally to be completed by 2012. As of the Solar Wind XIII conference in June 2012, the planned launch date was 2017. However, due to withdrawal first by Canada and then ESA, the project was postponed. It was launched on 9 october 2022.

The project is named after Kuafu, a giant in Chinese mythology who chased the sun and died trying.

One of these satellites would be placed at the Sun-Earth Lagrangian Point L1, while the other two would be placed in polar orbits.

References

Satellites of China
Space weather